Sohail Khan (born 23 June 1967) is a Pakistani former cricketer. He played 34 first-class and 18 List A matches for several domestic teams in Pakistan between 1983 and 1994.

See also
 List of Pakistan Automobiles Corporation cricketers

References

External links

1967 births
Living people
Pakistani cricketers
House Building Finance Corporation cricketers
Pakistan Automobiles Corporation cricketers
Service Industries cricketers
Cricketers from Lahore
Lahore cricketers